Baneshwor is the largest residential area of Kathmandu, Nepal. The area is composed of New-Baneshwor, Mid-Baneshwor, and Old-Baneshwor, Baneshwor Height, Minbhawan, Shankhamul, Bhimsengola and Thapa Gaun.. Major landmarks of Baneshwor include the current meeting place of the Federal Parliament of Nepal, the International Convention Centre. Maitighar Mandala is located at the southern border of the neighborhood. the people in this area are employed in the private business or are in the corporate sectors.

Baneshwor is a local financial and educational hub hosting several national banks and institutions. The following organisations have their headquarters in Baneshwor:

Banks
 Shangri-la Development Bank Limited
 Lumbini Bikas Bank Limited
 Janata Bank Nepal Limited
 Global IME Bank
 Himalayan Bank
 Nabil Bank
 Mega Bank Nepal Limited
 Machchhapuchhre Bank
 Prime Commercial Bank
 Century Bank
 Citizens Bank International
 Standard Chartered Nepal
 Kumari Bank
 NIC Asia Bank
 Nepal Bank Limited
 Bank of Kathmandu
 Everest Bank
 Laxmi Bank
 Nepal SBI Bank
 Nepal Investment Bank
 Civil Bank
 Agriculture Development Bank
 Kamana Sewa Bikas Bank
 Jyoti Bikash Bank
 Kailash Bikash Bank

Transportation
Busses of Sajha Yatayat serve Baneshwor. Other private Bus companies also stop at several points in the neighborhood.

References

External links
Google Map showing Baneshwor Area
Facebook page of Baneshwor

Kathmandu District
Neighbourhoods in Kathmandu